Joseph Hammons (March 3, 1787 – March 29, 1836) was an American politician and a United States representative from New Hampshire.

Early life
Hammons was born in Cornish, York County, Maine, and educated by private tutors and in the common schools. In addition, he studied medicine in Ossipee, Carroll County, New Hampshire and commenced practice in Farmington, Strafford County, New Hampshire in 1817. He was the only physician in town for many years.

Career
Elected as a Jacksonian to the Twenty-first and Twenty-second Congresses, Hammons served as United States Representative for the state of New Hampshire from (March 4, 1829 – March 3, 1833). After leaving Congress, he continued his practice and was postmaster at Dover, Strafford County, New Hampshire from June 1833 until his death.

Death
Hammons died in Farmington, Strafford County, New Hampshire, on March 29, 1836 (age 49 years, 26 days). He is interred at the Hammons Family Cemetery, Farmington, Strafford County, New Hampshire.

References

External links

1787 births
1838 deaths
People from Cornish, Maine
Jacksonian members of the United States House of Representatives from New Hampshire
People from Alstead, New Hampshire
People from Farmington, New Hampshire
19th-century American politicians